KultureCity is a nonprofit organization which trains staff at venues and then certifies venues which have sensory inclusive modifications. The organization also provides application for Apple and Android devices which lists Sensory friendly venues to assist those with Sensory processing disorders.

Background
KultureCity is a Nonprofit organization which directs users of their app to sensory-friendly accommodations at more than 900 different venues in the United States. The app is designed to assist guests with autism and other sensory processing disorders in finding sensory friendly locations. 

Their motto is: "Make the nevers possible by creating sensory accessibility and inclusion for those with invisible disabilities".

Certification

KultureCity partners with venues to provide training and tools to venues and events. The "Sensory Inclusion Certification" process involves training of venue staff by leading medical professionals regarding how to recognize those guests with sensory needs. Accommodations are meant to serve those with autism, dementia, PTSD. The organization also trains and certifies police department personnel. They provide details of items which can be included in a special sensory bag which can be made available to those who suffer from sensory sensitivities. The items in the bag may include fidget items, noise canceling headphones, verbal cue cards and weighted lap pads.

Beginning in 2020 KultureCity organized sensory inclusive venues and events which included the NFL Pro Bowl, Super Bowl and the Pro Football Hall of Fame; Sixteen NBA arenas, 5 NFL stadiums, 5 NHL arenas, zoos, and many other venues in the United States.

Awards
In 2014 and 2015 Guidestar named KultureCity as Best National Non-Profit. Greatnonprofits.org named Kulture City the best-reviewed special needs nonprofit in 2014 and 2015. In 2015 Microsoft Corporation's "Windows 10 Upgrade Your World Initiative" listed KultureCity as one of its 10 nonprofits partners. The award came with a $50,000 USD grant. Also in In 2015, Kulture City won the "Community Cause of the Year" sponsored by the Vestavia Voice newspaper.

References

External links
Video - We all seek the same sense of inclusion - Julian Maha

Non-profit organizations based in the United States
Sensory accommodations
Autism-related organizations in the United States
Post-traumatic stress disorder
Organizations established in 2013
Dementia